Chicken Island is an island located close to the south-western coast of Tasmania, Australia. The low, flat,  island is part of the Maatsuyker Islands Group, and comprises part of the Southwest National Park and the Tasmanian Wilderness World Heritage Site.

Flora and fauna
The vegetation is dominated by Sarcocornia quinqueflora and Senecio pinnatifolius.  Recorded breeding seabird and wader species are the little penguin, short-tailed shearwater, fairy prion, common diving-petrel, Pacific gull, silver gull, sooty oystercatcher and Caspian tern.

See also

 South East Cape
 South West Cape
 List of islands of Tasmania

References

Islands of Tasmania
Protected areas of Tasmania
South West Tasmania